George Mukabi (1930–1963) was a folk musician from Kenya, and was one of the first recording musicians in the country. In his short musical career he recorded fewer than 30 songs.

He was influenced by "Nyasa" Malawian bands and set out to play similar music in the finger-picking style. His playing was massively popular and influential, affecting urban players like John Mwale, and created what became sukuti music, popular among western Kenya's traditional people.

He was killed during an argument with his wife's family in Butsotso. George Mukabi was among early Africans to record music in Kenya.

Some of his popular songs which still grace our air waves are "Sengula Nakupenda" and "Mtoto si Nguo" which he composed but performed by his son.

His style of music, "omutibo", was popular among urban Africans and played a great part in influencing urban musicians such as John Mwale.

However his illustrious musical career ended tragically in 1963, after he pursued his second wife who had broken his guitar, dragged her out of her parents' house and assaulted her.

Mukabi, who had just returned from Nairobi where he had gone for music business, left his guitar in his second wife's house and went to have a rest in his first wife's house.
The younger wife thought Mukabi was going to give all the money he had brought from Nairobi to the first wife, and out of jealousy took her husband's guitar and smashed it.
Mukabi heard the commotion and rushed to his second wife's house to find out what was happening. The lady upon realizing what she had just done, took off to her parents' home as Mukabi gave chase.

Mukabi really cherished his guitar which he was gifted by an Englishman and there was no way he could let his second wife get away with her actions.
On arrival at his in-laws which was just around the corner, he passed his father in law who was basking in the sun and went straight to the house to look for his wife. When he failed to find her in the sitting room, he entered the bedroom where he found her hiding under her parents' bed.
He dragged her out and started beating her.

The woman's father who was too old to fight, screamed for help from the villagers who were still in their farms.
They arrived with machetes, jembes and rungus and straightaway descended on Mukabi. Despite sustaining deep cuts, Mukabi still managed to cross River Yala as he tried to save his life. However, he collapsed just some distance from the banks.

The villagers who were still in hot pursuit caught up with him and finished him off by cutting him into pieces.
They then placed the body parts on a mkokoteni and took them to Kakamega Hospital.

References

1930 births
1963 deaths
Kenyan musicians
People from Kakamega
Kenyan guitarists
20th-century guitarists